is a 1986 video game based on the third film of The Wonderful World of Puss 'n Boots that was released exclusively in Japan for the Family Computer. Four years later, the game (with several modifications) was released in North America under the title Puss 'n Boots: Pero's Great Adventure.

The main character is the Puss in Boots character from the tale; a cat named Pero (Toei Animation's mascot) is also known as 'Perrault' in the game, as that was the name of the original author of the Puss In Boots story, Charles Perrault. He is known for helping an impoverished master attain wealth through the use of trickery.

Gameplay
Loosely based on Jules Verne's classic novel Around the World in Eighty Days tied together with a classic anime, the player has 80 days in order to travel the world; this is shown through a time limit. One day passes in the game approximately every minute, although certain items can subtract the number of remaining days, providing the player with less time to complete the game. If these 80 days elapse before the player finishes the trip, the game is over no matter how many lives the player has remaining. Places that are explored include: England, the Atlantic Ocean, Arabia, Hong Kong, the Pacific Ocean, Alaska, the North Pole, and Big Ben. The game features "death water", a video game feature where video game characters instantly die after coming into contact with a watery substance.

This game also involves driving boats, cars, and balloons in addition to the standard walking through the stages.

See also
 Adaptations of Puss in Boots

References

1986 video games
Japan-exclusive video games
Nintendo Entertainment System games
Nintendo Entertainment System-only games
Platform games
Shouei games
Toei Animation video game projects
Video games about cats
Video games based on anime and manga
Video games based on fairy tales
Video games developed in Japan
Works based on Around the World in Eighty Days
Works based on Puss in Boots
Video games based on works by Jules Verne